Sundsvall is a city and the seat of Sundsvall Municipality in Västernorrland County, Sweden. It has a population of 58,807 as of 2020; more than 95,000 live in the municipal area. It is Sweden's 21st largest city by population.

History

The town was chartered in 1621, and a first urban plan for Sundsvall was probably created by Olof Bure in 1642, less likely in 1623. It has a port by the Gulf of Bothnia, and is located 395 km north of Stockholm. The city has burned down and been rebuilt four times. The first time, in 1721, it was set on fire by the Russian army during the Russian Pillage of 1719-1721. 

According to one historian, Swedish industrialism started in Sundsvall when the Tunadal sawmill bought a steam-engine driven saw in 1849. In the early 20th century Sundsvall was an even greater centre of forestry industry in Sweden than it is today.
The first large Swedish strike was the "Sundsvall strike" in 1879. The industrial heritage makes social democrat and socialist sympathies more prevalent in the Sundsvall region than in Sweden as a whole.

In 1888 on 25 June, strong wind and dry conditions contributed to two city fires in Sweden on the same day. On this day both Umeå and Sundsvall caught fire. The Sundsvall fire was the largest in Sweden's history. It is presumed that the fire was caused by a spark from a steamship. After the fire, and unlike Umeå, the decision was to rebuild using stone. Sundsvall's centre was later nicknamed Stenstaden (the stone city). One advantage of the new construction was that within three years the town was arguing that it should be allowed reduced insurance as new rules had been brought in that applied to wooden towns. One disadvantage was that after the fire only the better off could afford to live in the centre.

Today Sundsvall is not only dominated by the pulp and paper industry, and the aluminium production but there are also banks, insurance companies, telecommunications administration and a number of large public data-processing centres such as the national social insurance board. The main campus of the newly established Mid Sweden University (Mittuniversitetet) is also located in the city. The university is a collaboration between Östersund, Sundsvall and Härnösand.

Demography

Culture
During 1987–2013, there was a summer music festival called Gatufesten.  Starting in 2014 there's a new one called Hamnyran. There are two theatres and various musical venues. There is also a small guitar festival and a larger heavy metal festival every autumn called Nordfest. Sundsvall is also home to the unique festival Musikschlaget, which is a song contest for groups around Sweden with disabilities.

Transport
Its airport is Sundsvall-Timrå Airport, also called Midlanda.

Sport

Alnö IF, association football
GIF Sundsvall, association football
IF Sundsvall Hockey, ice hockey
IFK Sundsvall, association football
Sundsvalls AIK (sv), wrestling (https://www.sundsvallsaik.se/)
Sundsvalls DFF, association football
Kovlands IF, multi-sport alliance club
Kovlands Ishockeyförening, ice hockey
Selånger SK, multi-sport alliance club
Selånger FK, association football
Selånger SK Bandy, bandy
Sidsjö-Böle IF, association football
Sund IF, association football
Sundsvall Dragons, basketball
Sundsvall Flames, American football

Notable people
Otto Wallin, boxer
Garmarna, folk band
The Same, punk band 
Sigrid Hjertén (1885–1948), painter
Vilma Abrahamsson (1999–), football player
Harry Ahlin (1900–1969), actor
Per Arne Collinder (1890–1975), astronomer (born in Sundsvall)
Gina Dirawi (1990–), television presenter, host of Melodifestivalen 2012 and 2013
Elin Ek (1976–), TV and radio personality (as Grynet), singer
Fredrik Ericsson (1975–2010), extreme skier
Jessica Falk (1973–), singer-songwriter and musician
Anders Abraham Grafström (1790–1870), poet
Anders Graneheim (1962–), bodybuilder
Stan Hasselgård (1922–1948), musician
Bengt Lindström (1925–2008), artist
Kjell Lönnå (1936–), musician
Fredrik Modin (1974–), ice hockey player
Max Magnus Norman (1973–), artist
Erik Ringmar (1960–), political scientist and author
Helen Sjöholm (1970–), singer, actress and musical theater performer
Hanna Glas (1993–), football player
Carl Strandlund (1899–1974), Swedish-American inventor and entrepreneur 
Henrik Zetterberg (1980–), ice hockey player
Yohio (1995–), singer and guitarist
Kevin Walker (1989–) football player and winner of Idol 2013
Charlotte Kalla (1987–) cross-country skier
Carl-Herman Tillhagen (1906~2002), folklorist
Emil Forsberg (1991–), football player
Elias Pettersson (1998–), ice hockey player and 2019 Calder Trophy winner
MyAnna Buring (1979–), actress (born in Sundsvall)

Gallery

Climate

Sundsvall has a climate which is on the border between subarctic (Dfc) and cold humid continental (Dfb), leaning towards the latter in recent years. Temperatures are made significantly milder and regulated by the influence from the Gulf Stream.

References

External links

Sundsvall – Official site
 article Sundsvall from Nordisk Familjebok (1918)
 sundsvallturism.com – Sundsvalls tourist information bureau.
   Sundsvalltown.se – The alternative guide to Sundsvall.
 sundsvallsbilder.com – Blog with photos from Sundsvall.

 
Populated places in Sundsvall Municipality
Medelpad
Municipal seats of Västernorrland County
Swedish municipal seats
Coastal cities and towns in Sweden
Cities in Västernorrland County